Rudy Haleydt (born 15 February 1951) is a retired Belgian football midfielder.

References

1951 births
Living people
Belgian footballers
S.C. Eendracht Aalst players
K.S.V. Waregem players
Cercle Brugge K.S.V. players
Belgian Pro League players
Challenger Pro League players
Belgium international footballers
Association football midfielders
R.A.E.C. Mons managers